Thomasville Commercial Historic District is a historic district that was listed on the National Register of Historic Places in 1984 and was both increased and decreased in 2004.

The district consists primarily of one- and two-story commercial buildings built between 1880 and the 1940s.

It has a number of buildings dating back to the 1880s. For the historic district the Thomasville Main Street Program helped raise  over $44 million for the district.

The district includes:
Thomas County Courthouse, 225 North Broad Street, separately NRHP-listed
Thomasville Depot, separately NRHP-listed (three contributing buildings; within the 2004 increase)
B'nai Israel Synagogue, separately NRHP-listed (within the 2004 increase)
 Hollybrook Building - Brokerage Exchange built in 1882
 Lapham-Patterson House
 Thomasville Cultural Center

References

Historic districts on the National Register of Historic Places in Georgia (U.S. state)
Geography of Thomas County, Georgia
National Register of Historic Places in Thomas County, Georgia